Carthage High School is a public high school located in the city of Carthage, Texas. It is part of the Carthage Independent School District located in central Panola County and classified as a 4A school by the UIL. In 2013, the school was rated "Met Standard" by the Texas Education Agency.

Athletics 
The Carthage Bulldogs compete in the following sports: Cross Country, Volleyball, Football, Basketball, Powerlifting, Soccer, Golf, Tennis, Track, Baseball & Softball

State Titles
Carthage (UIL)

Baseball
1990(4A), 2005(3A), 2009(3A)
Football
2008(3A/D2), 2009(3A/D2), 2010(3A/D2), 2013(3A/D1), 2016(4A/D1), 2017(4A/D1), 2019(4A/D1), 2020(4A/D2), 2022(4A/D2)

Carthage Turner (PVIL)

Boys Basketball 
1963(PVIL-3A)

State Finalists
Carthage (UIL)

Baseball
2001(4A)
Girls Basketball 
1982(4A)
Football
1991(4A)

Carthage Turner (PVIL)

Boys Basketball 
1962(PVIL-3A), 1965(PVIL-3A), 1968(PVIL-3A)

Academics
Academic Events:
Chess Team
Debate Team
One Act Play
Speech
Journalism

UIL Academic Titles:
1959 3A State Championship - Boys Debate
1959 3A State Championship - Girls Debate
1960 3A State Championship - Girls Extemporaneous Speaking
1960 3A State Championship - Girls Debate
1961 3A State Championship - Boys Debate
1962 3A State Championship - Boys Debate
1962 3A State Championship - Girls Debate
1963 3A State Championship - Boys Debate
1965 3A State Championship - Boys Informative Speaking
1999 4A State Championship - Poetry Interpretation
2003 Class 3A Texas State Championship - Cross-Examination Debate
2003 Class 3A Championship - Biology 
2009 Class 3A Texas State Champions - Journalism

Other State Titles:
2003 Top Ranking Engineering Team - JETS
2009 Texas State Champions - TSA
2010 Texas State Champions - TSA
2010 Class 3A Texas State Champions (non-UIL) - Powerlifting (123 lbs)

Notable alumni 
John Booty, former NFL professional athlete
Linda Davis, country music singer
George Cochran, former Major League Baseball (MLB) player
Philip Humber, MLB pitcher
Brian Lawrence, former MLB pitcher
 Audray McMillian, former NFL professional athlete and entrepreneur
Jim Reeves, country music singer
Brandon Rhyder, country music singer
Jack Boynton Strong, Texas lawyer, businessman, and politician

References

External links 
Carthage ISD
2019-2020 Carthage ISD Student Handbook
Schools in Panola County, Texas
Public high schools in Texas